Lorenz Larkin (born September 3, 1986) is an American professional mixed martial artist currently competing in the Welterweight division of Bellator MMA. A professional competitor since 2009, Larkin formerly competed for Strikeforce and the Ultimate Fighting Championship (UFC). As of March 14, 2023, he is #8 in the Bellator Welterweight Rankings and #8 in the Bellator Middleweight Rankings.

Background
Larkin was born and raised in Riverside, California as one of nine siblings. Larkin began training in boxing at a young age and also played football, but soon gave it up because he did not excel at it or other team sports. He attended Riverside Polytechnic High School. Afterwards, he continued boxing but was not able to compete as much as he would like to, due to his father's objections. Larkin also felt that he was too short to be a professional boxer in the heavyweight division, so he took up Kickboxing and Brazilian jiu-jitsu which led him to mixed martial arts. Prior to his career in mixed martial arts, Larkin also trained in Kung Fu. In an interview, Larkin stated he enjoyed the martial arts movies that were popular around the time he was growing up and wanted to be a Kung Fu fighter.

Mixed martial arts career

Early career
Larkin holds records of 5-0 and 10-0 in amateur boxing and amateur mixed martial arts, respectively, with one of those wins coming against Heavyweight prospect Walt Harris. Making his professional MMA debut in August 2009, he compiled an undefeated record of 12-0.

Strikeforce
Larkin made his debut in the Strikeforce promotion on April 1, 2011, against kickboxer Scott Lighty at Strikeforce Challengers: Wilcox vs. Damm, replacing Satoshi Ishii on a week's notice. Larkin won the fight via technical knockout in the second round and earned praise for his impressive performance against a veteran fighter, while being largely unheard of himself.

Larkin returned to the promotion in June 2011. He faced Gian Villante and won the fight via unanimous decision. Villante controlled the first round from top position but Larkin turned it around in the second round by keeping the fight on the feet and landing many strong kicks to the legs of his opponent. Larkin kept this up in the third round while also scoring an unexpected takedown in the last ten seconds.

Larkin was originally scheduled to headline the next challengers event against Virgil Zwicker but Zwicker pulled out due to an injury. Larkin instead faced Nick Rossborough and won the fight via unanimous decision.

Larkin next faced Muhammed Lawal at Strikeforce: Rockhold vs. Jardine. He lost the fight via KO in the second round, the first loss of his professional career. However, the result was overturned and changed to a No Contest after Lawal tested positive for steroids (Drostanolone).

For his next fight, Larkin dropped down to Middleweight division. He faced heavy-handed future UFC welterweight champion Robbie Lawler on July 14, 2012, at Strikeforce: Rockhold vs. Kennedy. He won the fight via unanimous decision.

Larkin was to challenge Luke Rockhold for the championship on November 3, 2012, at Strikeforce: Cormier vs. Mir. The event was to be held at the Chesapeake Energy Arena in Oklahoma City, Oklahoma, but was cancelled in October 2012. The fight was rescheduled and set to take place on January 12, 2013. However, Rockhold once again pulled out of the fight due to injury. Larkin was then scheduled to face Ronaldo Souza, but the fight never materialized.

Ultimate Fighting Championship
In January 2013, the Strikeforce organization was closed by its parent company Zuffa. A list of fighters scheduled to be brought over to the Ultimate Fighting Championship was released in mid-January and Larkin was one of the fighters listed.

On February 9, 2013, the UFC announced that Larkin would make his debut against Francis Carmont at UFC on Fox: Henderson vs. Melendez in San Jose, California. He lost the fight due to a controversial unanimous decision with many major MMA media scoring the fight as a win for Larkin.

For his second UFC appearance, Larkin faced Chris Camozzi on November 6, 2013, at UFC Fight Night 31. He won the fight via unanimous decision.

Larkin faced Brad Tavares on January 15, 2014, at UFC Fight Night 35. He lost the fight via unanimous decision.

Larkin faced Costas Philippou at UFC Fight Night 40. He lost the back-and-forth fight via knockout in the first round.

Larkin was expected to face Derek Brunson at UFC 176. However, after UFC 176 was cancelled, Larkin/Brunson was rescheduled and eventually took place on August 30, 2014, at UFC 177. Larkin lost the fight by unanimous decision.

For his next fight, Larkin moved down to the welterweight division. He faced John Howard on January 18, 2015, at UFC Fight Night 59. Larkin won the fight via TKO in the first round. The performance also earned Larkin his first Performance of the Night bonus award.

Larkin faced Santiago Ponzinibbio on June 27, 2015, at UFC Fight Night 70. Larkin won the fight via TKO in the second round and earned a Fight of the Night bonus.

Larkin faced Albert Tumenov on January 2, 2016, at UFC 195. He lost the back-and-forth fight by split decision.

Larkin faced Jorge Masvidal on May 29, 2016, at UFC Fight Night 88. He won the back-and-forth fight via split decision.

Larkin faced Neil Magny on August 20, 2016, at UFC 202. He won the bout via TKO in the first round, after hurting his opponent with leg kicks and finishing the fight with elbows.

Bellator MMA
In March 2017, Larkin announced he had signed a multi-fight deal with Bellator MMA.

In his debut, Larkin faced welterweight champion Douglas Lima at Bellator NYC on June 24, 2017. He lost the fight via unanimous decision.

In his second fight for the promotion, Larkin faced British striker Paul Daley on September 23, 2017, at Bellator 183. Despite a good first round where he stunned Daley multiple times, He went on to lose the fight via knockout in the second round.

Larkin faced Fernando Gonzalez in a catchweight bout at Bellator 193 on January 26, 2018. He won the fight via unanimous decision.

Larkin was expected to face Erick Silva at Bellator 207. On October 1, 2018, news surfaced that Silva pulled out of the fight due to an injury, and he was replaced by Ion Pascu. He won the fight via unanimous decision.

Larkin was expected to headline Bellator 219 against Andrey Koreshkov on March 29, 2019, but withdrew from the fight due to an injury. The bout with Koreshkov eventually headlined Bellator 229 on October 4, 2019. Larkin won the back-and-forth bout via split decision.

Larkin faced Keita Nakamura at Bellator & Rizin: Japan on December 29, 2019. He won the fight by unanimous decision.

Larkin was scheduled to face Costello van Steenis in a middleweight bout at Bellator 258 on May 7, 2021. On April 27, it was announced that van Steenis suffered an injury during training and pulled out of the bout. On May 1, former Bellator Middleweight World Champion Rafael Carvalho was announced as a replacement. Larkin won the bout via split decision.

Larkin was scheduled to fight Khalid Murtazaliev on May 6, 2022 at Bellator 280. However at the end of March, Murtazaliev pulled out of the bout and was replaced by Anthony Adams. Adams in turn pulled out as well and was replaced by UFC vet Kyle Stewart. Larkin won the bout within the first round, landing multiple knees to the body and punches on Stewart while he was on the ground.

Returning to Welterweight, Larkin faced Mukhamed Berkhamov on July 22, 2022 at Bellator 283. Half way through the first round, Larkin landed an elbow on the back of Berkhamov's head, resulting in him not being able to continue. The bout was declared a no contest.

The rematch of the no contest against Mukhamed Berkhamov took place on February 4, 2023 at Bellator 290. Larkin knocked out Berkhamov with an elbow off the clinch in the first round.

Championships and accomplishments
Mez Sports MMA
MSMMA Light Heavyweight Championship (One time)
Ultimate Fighting Championship
Fight of the Night (One time) vs. Santiago Ponzinibbio
Performance of the Night (One time) vs. John Howard

Mixed martial arts record

|-
|Win
|align=center|25–7 (2)
|Mukhamed Berkhamov
|KO (elbow)
|Bellator 290
|
|align=center|1
|align=center|1:41
|Inglewood, California, United States
|
|-
|NC
|align=center|24–7 (2)
|Mukhamed Berkhamov
|No Contest (illegal elbow)
|Bellator 283
|
|align=center|1
|align=center|2:52
|Tacoma, Washington, United States
|
|-
|Win
|align=center|24–7 (1)
|Kyle Stewart
|TKO (knees and punches)
|Bellator 280
|
|align=center|1
|align=center|4:44
|Paris, France
|
|-
|Win
|align=center|23–7 (1)
|Rafael Carvalho
|Decision (split)
|Bellator 258
|
|align=center|3
|align=center|5:00
|Uncasville, Connecticut, United States
|
|-
|Win
|align=center|22–7 (1)
|Keita Nakamura
|Decision (unanimous)
|Bellator & Rizin: Japan
|
|align=center|3
|align=center|5:00
|Saitama, Japan
|
|-
|Win
|align=center|21–7 (1)
|Andrey Koreshkov
|Decision (split)
|Bellator 229
|
|align=center| 3
|align=center| 5:00
|Temecula, California, United States
|
|-
|Win
|align=center|20–7 (1)
|Ion Pascu
|Decision (unanimous)
|Bellator 207
|
|align=center|3
|align=center|5:00
|Uncasville, Connecticut, United States
|
|-
|Win
|align=center|19–7 (1)
|Fernando Gonzalez
|Decision (unanimous)
|Bellator 193
|
|align=center|3
|align=center|5:00
|Temecula, California, United States
|
|-
|Loss
|align=center|18–7 (1)
|Paul Daley
|KO (punches)
|Bellator 183
|
|align=center|2
|align=center|2:40
|San Jose, California, United States
|
|-
|Loss
|align=center|18–6 (1)
|Douglas Lima
|Decision (unanimous)
|Bellator NYC
|
|align=center|5
|align=center|5:00
|New York City, New York, United States
|
|-
|Win
|align=center|18–5 (1)
|Neil Magny
|TKO (elbows)
|UFC 202
|
|align=center|1
|align=center|4:08
|Las Vegas, Nevada, United States
|
|-
|Win
|align=center|17–5 (1)
|Jorge Masvidal
|Decision (split)
|UFC Fight Night: Almeida vs. Garbrandt
|
|align=center|3
|align=center|5:00
|Las Vegas, Nevada, United States
| 
|-
|Loss
|align=center|16–5 (1)
|Albert Tumenov
|Decision (split)
|UFC 195
|
|align=center|3
|align=center|5:00
|Las Vegas, Nevada, United States
|
|-
| Win
| align=center| 16–4 (1)
| Santiago Ponzinibbio
| TKO (punches)
| UFC Fight Night: Machida vs. Romero
| 
| align=center| 2
| align=center| 3:07
| Hollywood, Florida, United States
| 
|-
| Win
| align=center| 15–4 (1)
| John Howard
| TKO (punches)
| UFC Fight Night: McGregor vs. Siver
| 
| align=center| 1
| align=center| 2:17
| Boston, Massachusetts, United States
| 
|-
| Loss
| align=center| 14–4 (1)
| Derek Brunson
| Decision (unanimous)
| UFC 177
| 
| align=center| 3
| align=center| 5:00
| Sacramento, California, United States
| 
|-
| Loss
| align=center| 14–3 (1)
| Costas Philippou
| KO (punches)
| UFC Fight Night: Brown vs. Silva
| 
| align=center| 1
| align=center| 3:47
| Cincinnati, Ohio, United States
| 
|-
| Loss
| align=center| 14–2 (1)
| Brad Tavares
| Decision (unanimous)
| UFC Fight Night: Rockhold vs. Philippou
| 
| align=center| 3
| align=center| 5:00
| Duluth, Georgia, United States
| 
|-
| Win
| align=center| 14–1 (1)
| Chris Camozzi
| Decision (unanimous)
| UFC: Fight for the Troops 3
| 
| align=center| 3
| align=center| 5:00
| Fort Campbell, Kentucky, United States
| 
|-
| Loss
| align=center| 13–1 (1)
| Francis Carmont
| Decision (unanimous)
| UFC on Fox: Henderson vs. Melendez
| 
| align=center| 3
| align=center| 5:00
| San Jose, California, United States
| 
|-
| Win
| align=center| 13–0 (1)
| Robbie Lawler
| Decision (unanimous)
| Strikeforce: Rockhold vs. Kennedy
| 
| align=center| 3
| align=center| 5:00
| Portland, Oregon, United States
| 
|-
| NC
| align=center| 12–0 (1)
| Muhammed Lawal
| NC (overturned)
| Strikeforce: Rockhold vs. Jardine
| 
| align=center| 2
| align=center| 1:32
| Las Vegas, Nevada, United States
| 
|-
| Win
| align=center| 12–0
| Nick Rossborough
| Decision (unanimous)
| Strikeforce Challengers: Larkin vs. Rossborough
| 
| align=center| 3
| align=center| 5:00
| Las Vegas, Nevada, United States
| 
|-
| Win
| align=center| 11–0
| Gian Villante
| Decision (unanimous)
| Strikeforce Challengers: Fodor vs. Terry
| 
| align=center| 3
| align=center| 5:00
| Kent, Washington, United States
| 
|-
| Win
| align=center| 10–0
| Scott Lighty
| TKO (punches)
| Strikeforce Challengers: Wilcox vs. Damm
| 
| align=center| 2
| align=center| 3:15
| Stockton, California, United States
| 
|-
| Win
| align=center| 9–0
| Mike Cook
| TKO (punches)
| MEZ Sports: Pandemonium 4
| 
| align=center| 2
| align=center| 3:32
| Riverside, California, United States
| 
|-
| Win
| align=center| 8–0
| Hector Carrillo
| KO (head kick and punches)
| MEZ Sports: Pandemonium 3
| 
| align=center| 1
| align=center| 2:57
| Los Angeles, California, United States
| 
|-
| Win
| align=center| 7–0
| Rick Slaton
| KO (punches)
| MEZ Sports: Pandemonium 2
| 
| align=center| 1
| align=center| 1:06
| Riverside, California, United States
| 
|-
| Win
| align=center| 6–0
| João Assis
| KO (slam)
| Respect in the Cage
| 
| align=center| 1
| align=center| 1:43
| Hollywood, California, United States
|
|-
| Win
| align=center| 5–0
| Scott Carson
| KO (punches)
| MEZ Sports: Pandemonium at the Palladium
| 
| align=center| 1
| align=center| 2:54
| Los Angeles, California, United States
| 
|-
| Win
| align=center| 4–0
| Rick Guillen
| KO (punches)
| Champion Promotions: Clash of the Gladiators 2
| 
| align=center| 1
| align=center| 2:30
| Palm Springs, California, United States
| 
|-
| Win
| align=center| 3–0
| Mychal Clark
| Decision (split)
| Respect in the Cage 4
| 
| align=center| 3
| align=center| 5:00
| Pomona, California, United States
| 
|-
| Win
| align=center| 2–0
| Giovanni Sarran
| Decision (unanimous)
| Chaos in the Cage 6
| 
| align=center| 3
| align=center| 5:00
| Lancaster, California, United States
| 
|-
| Win
| align=center| 1–0
| Lateef Williams
| KO (elbow)
| Fist Series: SummerFist III
| 
| align=center| 1
| align=center| 0:40
| Irvine, California, United States
|

See also

 List of current Bellator fighters
 List of male mixed martial artists

References

External links
 
 

1986 births
African-American mixed martial artists
American male mixed martial artists
American wushu practitioners
American practitioners of Brazilian jiu-jitsu
Light heavyweight mixed martial artists
Living people
Mixed martial artists from California
Mixed martial artists utilizing boxing
Mixed martial artists utilizing wushu
Mixed martial artists utilizing Brazilian jiu-jitsu
Sportspeople from Riverside, California
Ultimate Fighting Championship male fighters
21st-century African-American sportspeople
20th-century African-American people